Ultralight helicopters are classified as ultralight aircraft by the FAA and as Very Light Rotorcraft (VLR) by the EASA.

See also
 Personal Aerial Vehicles
 List of Personal Aerial Vehicles

References

Helicopters
Aviation-related lists
Lists of aircraft by design configuration
Homebuilt aircraft
Kit vehicles